Robert Clarence Robertson-Cuninghame,  (31 May 1924 – 10 September 2010), an Australian pastoralist and academic, was the fourth Chancellor of the University of New England, serving between 1981 and 1993.

Biography
A descendant of Frederick Robert White, the builder of Booloominbah, Robertson-Cuninghame was educated at The Armidale School and the University of Sydney where he lived at St Andrew's College and studied for a Bachelor of Science in Agriculture, before winning a Rhodes Scholarship to Oxford in 1949.

Robertson-Cuninghame served as patron to the UNE Union, who in 2003 named the central cafeteria Dr Rob's in his honour. Today, the university also offers the Robertson-Cuninghame Honours Scholarship for honours students, which has also been named after the former Chancellor.

See also 
 List of University of New England people

References

Australian Rhodes Scholars
1924 births
University of Sydney alumni
Alumni of Trinity College, Oxford
2010 deaths
Chancellors of the University of New England (Australia)